Gregório Francisco Penteado Freixo (born 8 September 1952 in Évora) is a Portuguese former football full-back (right or left) and manager.

External links

1952 births
Living people
People from Évora
Portuguese footballers
Association football defenders
Primeira Liga players
Liga Portugal 2 players
Associação Académica de Coimbra – O.A.F. players
Vitória S.C. players
S.C. Covilhã players
Portugal youth international footballers
Portugal under-21 international footballers
Portugal international footballers
Portuguese football managers
Primeira Liga managers
Liga Portugal 2 managers
Associação Académica de Coimbra – O.A.F. managers
Sportspeople from Évora District